Barbora Krejčíková was the defending champion but chose not to participate.

Katie Volynets won the title, defeating Wang Xiyu in the final, 6–4, 6–3.

Seeds

Draw

Finals

Top half

Bottom half

References

Main Draw

U.S. Pro Women's Clay Court Championships - Singles